Billy Bischoff, Jr. was an Australian professional rugby league footballer who played in the 1950s and 1960s. He played for Balmain in the New South Wales Rugby League (NSWRL) competition. His father, Billy Bischoff also played for Balmain and was a member of the 1939 premiership winning team.

Playing career
Bischoff made his first grade debut for Balmain in 1957. In 1958, Bischoff played at five-eighth in the clubs preliminary final loss scoring a try against St George. In 1961, Bischoff was selected to play for New South Wales against Queensland and featured in one game. At club level, Balmain reached the preliminary final against Western Suburbs but were defeated 8-5 with Bischoff playing at centre. In 1962, Bischoff was selected to play for NSW City.

In 1963, Balmain reached the semi final but were defeated by Parramatta. The following season in 1964, Balmain reached the grand final after defeating North Sydney and Parramatta. Bischoff played at halfback in the final as Balmain took a shock halftime lead over St George before Saints came back in the second half to win 11-6 at the Sydney Cricket Ground. Bischoff left Balmain at the end of 1965 having played 151 games for the club.

In 1966, Bischoff joined West Tamworth in the New South Wales country competition as captain-coach. He was selected in 1967 and 1968 for the NSW Country side. Bischoff retired from playing at the end of 1968.

References

1938 births
Living people
Australian rugby league players
Balmain Tigers players
Country New South Wales Origin rugby league team players
New South Wales City Origin rugby league team players
New South Wales rugby league team players
Place of birth missing (living people)
Place of death missing
Rugby league centres
Rugby league five-eighths
Rugby league halfbacks
Rugby league players from Sydney
Year of death missing